"Happy" is the sixteenth single by Bump of Chicken, released on April 14, 2010. It peaked at number-one on the Oricon weekly charts and Japan Hot 100.

Track listing
 "HAPPY" - 6.01
 "pinkie" - 5.05 - It was used as a theme song of Fuji Television's talk documentary 1924.
  (hidden track)

Personnel
Fujiwara Motoo — Guitar, vocals
Masukawa Hiroaki — Guitar
Naoi Yoshifumi — Bass
Masu Hideo — Drums

Chart performance

References

External links
HAPPY on the official Bump of Chicken website.

2010 singles
Bump of Chicken songs
Billboard Japan Hot 100 number-one singles
Oricon Weekly number-one singles
2010 songs
Toy's Factory singles